Robert Logan Ashford is an American football quarterback for the Auburn Tigers. He previously played for Oregon.

Early life and high school
Ashford grew up in Hoover, Alabama and attended Hoover High School. Ashford was rated a four-star recruit and initially committed to play college football and baseball at Ole Miss. He later de-committed and ultimately signed to play at Oregon.

College career
Ashford began his college career at Oregon. He did not appear in any games for the football team in two seasons. Ashford played for Oregon's baseball team during his freshman year, playing in 20 games as an outfielder and batting .200. He decided to focus solely on football after his freshman year. Following the end of his second football season, Ashford entered the NCAA transfer portal.

Ashford ultimately transferred to Auburn. He made his first career start against LSU on October 1, 2022, throwing for 337 yards in a 21–17 loss. Ashford passed for 1,613 yards with seven touchdown and seven interceptions while also rushing for 710 yards and seven touchdowns in 2022.

References

External links
Oregon Ducks football bio
Oregon Ducks baseball bio
Auburn Tigers bio

Living people
Players of American football from Alabama
American football quarterbacks
Auburn Tigers football players
Oregon Ducks football players
Oregon Ducks baseball players
2002 births